Carlos Perellon (born 1957, Madrid) is a Spanish writer and journalist. Perellon is best known for his novel La ciudad doble which won the Premio Herralde in 1994. It is his only book to date. Perellon has worked for UNICEF in New York City as director of Spanish-language publications.

References

Spanish male novelists
1954 births
Living people
Writers from Madrid
Male journalists
Spanish journalists
20th-century Spanish novelists
20th-century Spanish male writers